Cassinia venusta is a species of flowering plant in the family Asteraceae and is endemic to a small area near the border between New South Wales and Victoria. It is an erect shrub with glandular-hairy branchlets, glossy green, needle-shaped leaves, and corymbs of hundreds to thousands of yellowish flower heads.

Description
The upper surface of the leaves is glossy green and slightly sticky, the edges are rolled under and the lower surface is covered with woolly hairs. Between hundreds and thousands of heads are arranged in corymbs  in diameter.

Taxonomy and naming
Cassinia venusta was first formally described in 2004 by Anthony Edward Orchard in Australian Systematic Botany from specimens collected on the slopes of Pine Mountain in 2004. The specific epithet (venusta) means "charming" or "beautiful".

Distribution

References

venusta
Asterales of Australia
Flora of New South Wales
Flora of Victoria (Australia)
Plants described in 2004